Niepołomice Forest is a large forest complex in western part of Sandomierz Basin, about  east of Kraków (center). It is made up of a few protected areas which used to constitute a single virgin forest originally. Niepołomice Forest occupies an area between Vistula and Raba rivers. It is situated between the towns of Niepołomice, Baczków, Krzyżanowice and Mikluszowice.

The name Niepołomice derives from the Old Polish language word niepołomny which meant "impassable", or "impossible to destroy" or conquer.

Description
The forest consists of six nature reserves with the total area of 94.43 hectares. The biggest reserve called Gibiel (29.79 ha), covers the area with the most diverse flora and fauna, featuring 175 species of birds as well as European bison, deer, wild boar, wolves, lynx, and wild cats. The next reserve called Lipówka (25.73 ha) features 200-year-old nature monuments mainly lime trees, oaks and hornbeams. Slightly smaller Długosz Królewski Reserve, with an area of 24.14 ha (not far from the village of Stanisławice) was established for the protection of a rare flowering fern named Osmunda regalis. Reserve called Dębina (12.66 ha) is set up for the preservation of ancient oak trees. Koło Reserve, with a smaller area of 3.49 ha consists of age-old lime trees and hornbeams. The reserve called Wiślisko Kobyle (6.67 ha) is devoted to water plants. In the heart of Niepołomice Forest is the most protected area inhabited by the Polish wisent (Żubr), the heaviest surviving land animal in Europe.

History
Because of its close proximity to Kraków, then the capital of Poland, Niepołomice Forest was the most popular hunting ground for the Polish royalty beginning in the 13th century. In its vicinity, King Casimir III the Great built the Royal hunting Castle, later rebuilt by Sigismund I the Old and fitted with the Queen Bona Sforza's gardens.  The first official mention of the Niepołomice Forest comes from a document written in 1242, calling it "Kłaj". In 1393, the forest is mentioned as Niepołomice Woods (Las Niepołomicki), and in 1441 – for the first time, it was written about under its current name. Throughout its entire history, the forest was owned by the state – by the Polish kings between 13th and 18th centuries until the military partitions of Poland, and after liberation, by the sovereign state of Poland.

The early road leading through the forest was called the Royal Road (see also: the Royal Road of Kraków terminating at the Wawel Castle in the heart of the city). It was traveled by prominent Polish kings hunting for bear, the aurochs (extinct since 1627, pictured), wisent, and other big game. The forest was a source of major wood construction material. It was looked after by foresters and Masters of the Royal Hunt.

During the military partitions of Poland, from 1795 on, the Austro-Hungarian Empire (controlling the province for well over a century) destroyed most of the old-growth forest and replanted that area with fast growing pine trees meant for commerce. Even more thorough destruction of what remained of Niepołomice Forest came about during the Nazi German occupation of Poland between 1939 and 1945. The trees were cut indiscriminately and shipped to military bases and battle fronts across Europe. War crimes were being committed in the area by the Nazis, with Poles and Jews from the neighbouring towns of Bochnia and Niepołomice murdered deep in the woods. There are numerous mass graves in the forest including those of Polish soldiers from 156 Infantry Regiment of Army Kraków, killed on September 9, 1939, as well as those of local partisans who died before the end of World War II. Among the 40 hostages executed there on December 11, 1942, was the heroic President of Kraków, Dr Stanisław Klimecki.

At present, the forest is maintained according to modern forestry practices. Very old trees are generally rare. The program of reconstruction began in postwar Poland around the mid 20th century, including the reinstatement of native plants in drawn-out areas.

Tourism 
The forest is transversed by several walking trails including a  bicycle trail and the newly open  educational trail complete with informational placards about the local flora and fauna. Among the trails which lead deep into the forest, there is the  Niepołomice – Poszyna (green) trail called the Royal Road, and the two trails each , Grodkowice – Błoto – Sitowiec, and the Podłęże – Przyborów – Sitowiec (blue) trail leading to mass graves of Poles and Jews from World War II. There is also the  Stanisławice (red) trail leading toward the perimeter of the wisent reserve; however, the reserve is not accessible to visitors. All trails are designed and maintained by the Forestry Inspectorate of Niepołomice.

See also

Special Protection Areas in Poland

References

  Leszek Bartkowicz,  "Potencjalne konsekwencje hodowlane spontanicznego różnicowania strukturyw drzewostanach „borowego” kompleksu Puszczy Niepołomickiej" Forest Research Papers, 2008, Vol. 69 (1): 41–47.
 Wojciech Chełmicki, Stanisław Ciszewski, Mirosław Żelazny,  "Reconstructing ground-water level fluctuations in 20th century Niepołomice Forest" ERB and Northern European FRIEND Project 5 Conference, Demänovská dolina, Slovakia, 2002
 Pawel Kapusta, Grazyna Szarek-Lukaszewska, Józef Kiszka,  "Spatial analysis of lichen species richness in Niepolomice Forest" The Lichenologist (2004), 36:249-260 Cambridge University Press
 Stanisław Orzeł, Agricultural University of Cracow,  "A comparative analysis of slenderness of the main tree species of the Niepolomice Forest" Electronic Journal of Polish Agricultural Universities, 2007, Volume 10, Issue 2.

Forests of Poland
Geography of Lesser Poland Voivodeship
Parks in Lesser Poland Voivodeship
Natura 2000 in Poland
Holocaust locations in Poland